Sweet Home Independent School District is a public school district based in the community of Sweet Home, Texas (USA).

It is a small country school located a few miles north of Yoakum. It teaches children K-8th grade.  High school students attend school in either the Yoakum Independent School District (the district states that most students choose this option; thus, it aligns its calendar with Yoakum's) or the Hallettsville Independent School District.

In 2009, the school district was rated "recognized" by the Texas Education Agency.

References

External links
 

School districts in Lavaca County, Texas